This is a list of Sheriffs of Norfolk County, Massachusetts. The Sheriff is elected to serve a six-year term and oversees the Norfolk County House of Correction.

The current Sheriff is Patrick W. McDermott.

References

Massachusetts, Norfolk
Sheriffs of Norfolk County, Massachusetts